Copper beaten skull is a phenomenon wherein intense intracranial pressure disfigures the internal surface of the skull.  The name comes from the fact that the inner skull has the appearance of having been beaten with a ball-peen hammer, such as is often used by coppersmiths.  The condition is most common in children with  hydrocephalus and is due to abnormal collagen development and ossification.

References

Skull